FACT Liverpool is a new media arts centre in Liverpool, England. The building houses galleries, a cinema operated by Picturehouse, a bar and a café.

History
FACT was established as an organisation focussed on video and new media art, exhibiting and curating the work of artists that had little platform in the UK.

FACT was designed by architectural firm Austin-Smith:Lord. When FACT first opened in 2003, it was Liverpool's first new arts building in over 60 years, since the opening of the Liverpool Philharmonic Hall over 60 years prior. FACT is an exhibitor and producer of video and digital art, and had its 15th birthday in 2018.

FACT's first exhibition, Isaac Julien’s Baltimore, was commissioned for the opening of the building and continued to tour for the next decade. Since then, FACT has presented over 350 new media and digital artworks from artists including Pipilotti Rist, Nam June Paik, Haroon Mirza, Agnes Varda, Wu Tsang and Apichatpong Weerasethakul.

Exhibitions and events
FACT supports, produces and presents visual art that includes creative media and digital technology. In 2007 Picturehouse at FACT hosted a Question and Answer session with Quentin Tarantino for the UK release of Death Proof. In 2015 as part of an exhibition named Follow, FACT exhibited an artwork in which Shia LaBeouf answered phone calls from the public.

FACT is a partner venue of Liverpool Biennial and showed works by Agnes Varda and Mohamed Bourouissa for the 2018 edition. Also in 2018, FACT commissioned the immersive art installation AURORA at Toxteth Reservoir with artists Invisible Flock, and exhibited Broken Symmetries, an international exhibition co-produced by FACT, Arts at CERN, CCCB, Barcelona, Le Lieu unique, Nantes and iMAL, Brussels.

See also
Culture of Liverpool
Contemporary art
RopeWalks, Liverpool
National Science and Media Museum
 The Bluecoat

References

External links

Tourist attractions in Liverpool
Cultural organisations based in Liverpool
Buildings and structures in Liverpool
Cinemas in Merseyside
Art museums and galleries in Merseyside
Art museums established in 2003
Museums in Liverpool
2003 establishments in England
Arts foundations based in the United Kingdom